The 2013 FIM Ice Speedway World Championship was the 2013 version of FIM Individual Ice Racing World Championship season. The world champion was determined by ten races hosted in five cities, Krasnogorsk, Tolyatti, Assen, Inzell and Uppsala between 2 February and 24 March 2013.

Final Series

Classification

See also 
 2013 Team Ice Racing World Championship
 2013 Speedway Grand Prix in classic speedway

References 

Ice speedway competitions
World